Sichuan Radio and Television (SRT), is a major television network in China. The television network is owned by the Sichuan provincial government. The network is based in Chengdu in Sichuan.

History
SRT was launched 1 May 1960 as a local television network in Sichuan. SRT began broadcasting nationally on 1 August 2003.

Television Channels
 Sichuan TV (SCTV-1)
 Kangba TV (SCTV-2)
 Sichuan Economic Channel (SCTV-3)
 Sichuan InfoNews Channel (SCTV-4)
 Sichuan Series and Art Channel (SCTV-5)
 Sichuan Star Shopping Channel (SCTV-6)
 Sichuan Women and Children Channel (SCTV-7)
 Sichuan Science and Education Channel (SCTV-8)
 Sichuan Public Channel (SCTV-9)
 Sichuan Movie Channel (SCTV-10)
 Sichuan TV International

Production
SRT have broadcast notable programming such as 2 Days & 1 Night, often referred to as the Chinese version of  Korea's reality talent show 2 Days & 1 Night.

 2 Days & 1 Night
 China Positive Energy
 China Big Love Concert
 Love is All

References

Television networks in China
Television channels and stations established in 1960
Mass media in Chengdu
1960 establishments in China
Television in China